Dr. G. Nanchil Kumaran, also known as Nanjil Kumaran, is an Indian Police Service Officer from Tamil Nadu. He served as Police commissioner in Chennai, and he became famous for helping solve the 1998 Coimbatore bombings.

References

Indian Police Service officers
Living people
Year of birth missing (living people)